Society Hill is an unincorporated community and census-designated place (CDP) located within Piscataway Township, in Middlesex County, in the U.S. state of New Jersey. As of the 2010 United States Census, the CDP's population was 3,829.

Geography
According to the United States Census Bureau, the CDP had a total area of 1.387 square miles (3.594 km2), including 1.387 square miles (3.593 km2) of land and <0.001 square miles (0.001 km2) of water (0.03%). The CDP is located near the center of the township north of New Jersey Route 18 and Rutgers University's Busch Campus. The area mainly consists of single-family homes, an apartment complex, and a cemetery.

Demographics

Census 2010

Census 2000
As of the 2000 United States Census there were 3,804 people, 1,248 households, and 913 families living in the CDP. The population density was 1,072.1/km2 (2,774.0/mi2). There were 1,269 housing units at an average density of 357.6/km2 (925.4/mi2). The racial makeup of the CDP was 45.45% White, 15.96% African American, 0.24% Native American, 34.07% Asian, 1.42% from other races, and 2.87% from two or more races. Hispanic or Latino of any race were 5.05% of the population.

There were 1,248 households, out of which 38.5% had children under the age of 18 living with them, 59.7% were married couples living together, 10.4% had a female householder with no husband present, and 26.8% were non-families. 16.7% of all households were made up of individuals, and 2.6% had someone living alone who was 65 years of age or older. The average household size was 2.90 and the average family size was 3.34.

In the CDP the population was spread out, with 22.9% under the age of 18, 14.0% from 18 to 24, 33.8% from 25 to 44, 22.3% from 45 to 64, and 7.0% who were 65 years of age or older. The median age was 33 years. For every 100 females, there were 97.7 males. For every 100 females age 18 and over, there were 92.1 males.

The median income for a household in the CDP was $81,956, and the median income for a family was $89,411. Males had a median income of $60,000 versus $39,224 for females. The per capita income for the CDP was $31,143. About 1.8% of families and 4.3% of the population were below the poverty line, including 1.7% of those under age 18 and 2.3% of those age 65 or over.

References

Census-designated places in New Jersey
Census-designated places in Middlesex County, New Jersey
Piscataway, New Jersey